Of Rust and Bones is the fourth studio album by the Finnish gothic metal band Poisonblack. It was released on 22 March 2010 in Europe by Century Media Records.

Track listing 
All music by Laihiala, except for tracks 1, 3, 6 and 8 by Markus. All lyrics by Laihiala, except for track 3 by Seppänen (KYPCK's vocalist). All arrangements by Poisonblack.

 "Sun Shines Black" – 4:50
 "Leech" – 3:48
 "My World" – 3:57
 "Buried Alive" – 4:39
 "Invisible" – 8:07
 "Casket Case" – 3:44
 "Down the Drain" – 8:03
 "Alone" – 4:43
 "The Last Song" – 7:33

Personnel

Poisonblack 
 Ville Laihiala – vocals, lead guitar, backing vocals
 Janne Markus – guitar & backing vocals
 Antti Remes – bass
 Tarmo Kanerva – drums
 Marco Sneck – keyboards

Production 
 Hiili Hiilesmaa – recording, engineering, mixing, backing vocals

References 

 http://www.poisonblack.com/index.php?mact=News,cntnt01,detail,0&cntnt01articleid=184&cntnt01returnid=15
 http://www.beepworld.de/members40/poisonblack/discographie.htm
 http://www.centurymedia.com/release.aspx?IdRelease=653

External links 

 

2010 albums
Poisonblack albums
Century Media Records albums